Lennart Fridh is a Swedish former footballer who played as a midfielder. In 1991, Fridh played for Norwegian side SK Brann.

References

Year of birth missing (living people)
Living people
Association football midfielders
Swedish footballers
Allsvenskan players
Malmö FF players
SK Brann players
Eliteserien players
Swedish expatriate footballers
Expatriate footballers in Norway
Swedish expatriate sportspeople in Norway